The Court of Audits (in Dutch: Algemene Rekenkamer) is an independent body that audits the spending of the national government on its efficiency and legitimacy. The Court is appointed by cabinet on the advice of the House of Representatives. The Court of Audit is a High Council of State.

Similar institutions
Audit Scotland
Auditor General of Canada
Comptroller and Auditor General
Cour des Comptes (France)
Government Accountability Office (USA)
United Kingdom National Audit Office
Badan Pemeriksa Keuangan (Indonesia)

Government of the Netherlands
Netherlands
High Councils of State
Supreme audit institutions